Arteaga may refer to these footballers:

David Arteaga (born 1981), Spanish midfielder
Gerardo Arteaga (born 1998), Mexican defender
Jake Arteaga (born 2000), American midfielder
Jorge Arteaga (footballer, born 1966), Peruvian defender
Jorge Arteaga (footballer, born 1998), Peruvian goalkeeper
Manuel Arteaga (born 1994), Venezuelan forward
Mario Arteaga (born 1970), Mexican forward
Arteaga (footballer, born 1969) (Moisés García Fernández; born 1969), Spanish midfielder